NOCA may refer to:

National Organization for Competency Assurance
Northern Ontario Curling Association